Chang Kia-ngau (1889–1979), courtesy name Gōngquán (公权), was a Chinese banker, politician, and scholar. He was an influential figure in the history of modern Chinese central bank.

Biography
Chang was born in 1889 in Jiading outside of Shanghai. His grandfather was a Qing dynasty official and his father a doctor, so he and his siblings enjoyed educational opportunities not available to most of their countrymen.  While his brother, Carsun Chang distinguished himself in the world of politics, Chang Kia-ngau became a leading figure in modern Chinese banking.

Chang Kia-ngau was a supporter of reform in China and started his public service career in 1910 as editor-in-chief of the Official Gazette published by the Ministry of Communications.  In 1913 he started his banking career assistant manager of the Bank of China in Shanghai. He distinguished himself just a few years later in 1916 when he refused a request by Yuan Shikai to stop redeeming banknotes for silver.  The move was meant to secure silver deposits for Yuan's use, but would have undermined confidence in the new currency, so Chang disregarded the order and was instrumental in the bank's separation from the Peking government's control.  By 1923, the Bank of China was almost exclusively owned by private, Shanghai-based shareholders, and during the next decade, it became the largest bank, by far, in Republican China.

Under Chang's leadership, the Bank of China resisted the Kuomintang government's pressure to return to government control and to purchase government bonds which would contribute to ever-growing deficits.  In 1928, T. V. Soong tried quite aggressively to assert control over the bank, but Chang and the directors resisted, so Soong created the Central Bank of China.  Chang agreed to finance the new central bank's creation in exchange for a measure of independence and a charter to serve as the country's international exchange bank.  Chang's interest was the development of the country, particularly railroad and other infrastructure development, even if such projects were not particularly profitable for the bank.

In March 1935, H.H. Kung staged a coup against the Bank of China and Bank of Communications, forcing both to create new shares to allow the government to take a controlling share financed by overvalued government bonds.  Chang Kia-ngau was removed as general manager of the Bank of China and was offered a lesser role within the Central Bank.  He declined the offer, but in December 1935, accepted the position of Minister of Railways.

During much of the Sino-Japanese War, Chang served as Minister of Communications, accompanying the central government from Nanking to Chungking.  After mid-1943, he was in the U.S. frequently promoting aid to the Republic of China and at the negotiations of post-war arrangements, including aviation rights.  He wrote a book on railroad development which was published in the U.S. at a time when interest in China was high.  After the War, he was appointed Economic Commissioner for Manchuria, and his diaries from this period were also published in the U.S.

After his departure from China, Chang moved to the US and was a senior research fellow at the Hoover Institution at Stanford University.  He died on October 13, 1979, in Palo Alto, California.  His wife, Chang Pihya, died in Palo Alto on May 17, 1997.

References

1889 births
1979 deaths
Chinese bankers
Republic of China politicians from Shanghai
Businesspeople from Shanghai
Bank of China people
Chinese emigrants to the United States
Hoover Institution people
Governors of the Central Bank of the Republic of China
Chinese people in rail transport